The FAI Junior Cup is a cup competition organized by the Football Association of Ireland for junior association football clubs from the Republic of Ireland. The inaugural winners were Brideville. The competition's most successful club is Fairview Rangers of the Limerick & District League who have been winners nine times. According to the FAI, the FAI Junior Cup is one of the largest national amateur cup competitions in Europe. The 2012–13 competition saw an estimated 600 clubs enter the cup. The competition also serves a qualifier for the senior FAI Cup with the four semi-finalists all invited to take part in the FAI Cup.

History

League of Ireland
The cup's first winners were Brideville who beat Cobh Ramblers in the inaugural 1923–24 final. Brideville and Cobh Ramblers also became the first of several future League of Ireland members to feature in an FAI Junior Cup final. Sligo Rovers, Evergreen United, St Patrick's Athletic, Bray Wanderers, Home Farm, Finn Harps and St Francis all won the cup before joining the national league. Drogheda United were finalists on four occasions but never winners while Athlone Town won the cup twice during the 1930s after dropping out of the League of Ireland.

Recent finals
On 2 June 2013 the FAI Junior Cup final was played at the Aviva Stadium for the first time. It was played before a friendly international between the Republic of Ireland and Georgia. In 2013 Aviva joined Umbro as sponsors of the FAI Junior Cup and as part of the arrangement all the finals since then have been played at the Aviva Stadium. Sheriff Y.C. became the first club to win the cup following a final at the Aviva. The 2014–15 and 2015–16 finals were both played as double headers along with the FAI Intermediate Cup finals.

Television coverage
TV coverage debuted on TG4 and Setanta Sports in 2014 from the quarter-finals stage. Irish TV replaced TG4 as free-to-air broadcaster in 2015, and all three channels showed coverage in 2016, again from the quarter-finals stage.

In a major change, the 2016–17 season saw coverage begin with the third round in October, running on the newly-renamed eir Sport, IrishTV until its closure in March 2017, and TG4 from the quarter-finals stage.

List of finals

Notes

References

4
3
1923 establishments in Ireland